Jordan Wright (born 1991) is an American mixed martial artist.

Jordan Wright may also refer to:
 Jordan Wright, TV personality on Ex on the Beach (British series 7)
Jordan Wright (footballer), English footballer